Downy mildew refers to any of several types of oomycete microbes that are obligate parasites of plants. Downy mildews exclusively belong to the Peronosporaceae family. In commercial agriculture, they are a particular problem for growers of crucifers, grapes and vegetables that grow on vines. The prime example is Peronospora farinosa featured in NCBI-Taxonomy and HYP3. This pathogen does not produce survival structures in the northern states of the United States, and overwinters as live mildew colonies in Gulf Coast states. It progresses northward with cucurbit production each spring. Yield loss associated with downy mildew is most likely related to soft rots that occur after plant canopies collapse and sunburn occurs on fruit. Cucurbit downy mildew only affects leaves of cucurbit plants.

Symptoms 
Initial symptoms include large, angular or blocky, yellow areas visible on the upper surface. As lesions mature, they expand rapidly and turn brown. The under surface of infected leaves appears watersoaked. Upon closer inspection, a purple-brown mold (see arrow) becomes apparent. Small spores shaped like footballs can be observed among the mold with a 10x hand lens. In disease-favorable conditions (cool nights with long dew periods), downy mildew will spread rapidly, destroying leaf tissue without affecting stems or petioles.

Treatment and management

Cultural options 
Because the downy mildew pathogen does not overwinter in midwestern fields, crop rotations and tillage practices do not affect disease development. The pathogen tends to become established in late summer. Therefore, planting early season varieties may further reduce the already minor threat posed by downy mildew.

Chemical control 
Fungicides applied specifically for downy mildew control may be unnecessary. Broad spectrum protectant fungicides such as chlorothalonil, mancozeb, and fixed copper are at least somewhat effective in protecting against downy mildew infection. Systemic fungicides are labeled for use against cucurbit downy mildew, but are recommended only after diagnosis of this disease has been confirmed. In the United States, the Environmental Protection Agency has approved oxathiapiprolin for use against downy mildew. In Canada, a mixture of zoxamide and mancozeb was registered for control of the mildew under the trademark Gavel (fungicide) as early as 2008.

Organic control 
One way to control downy mildew is to eliminate moisture and humidity around the impacted plants. Watering from below, such as with a drip system, and improve air circulation through selective pruning. In enclosed environments, like in the house or in a greenhouse, reducing the humidity will help as well.

Resistant cultivars 
Recent breeding efforts have produced resistant basil cultivars. Choosing resistant cultivars, in combination with other prevention and control measures, can help growers with high downy mildew pressure still produce a viable crop.

Plant-specific mildews

Basil
Downy mildew of basil caused by Peronospora belbahrii has been a huge problem for both commercial producers and home growers. The disease was first reported in Italy in 2004, was reported in the U.S. in 2007 and 2008 and has been steadily increasing in prevalence, distribution, and economic importance since then.

Cucurbitaceae
Cucurbitaceae downy mildew (caused by Pseudoperonospora cubensis) is specific to cucurbits (e.g., cantaloupe (Cucumis melo), cucumber (Cucumis sativus), pumpkin, squash, watermelon (Citrullus lanatus) and other members of the gourd family). The disease is one of the most significant diseases of cucurbits worldwide.

Grapes
Plasmopara viticola is the causal agent of grapevine downy mildew.

Hops
Hop Downy Mildew (caused by Pseudoperonospora humuli) is specific to hops (Humulus lupulus). The disease is the single most devastating disease in Western United States hopyards, since the microbe thrives in moist climates. Infected young hop bines become stunted with thickened clusters of pale curled leaves. These spikes have a silvery upper surface, while the undersides of leaves become blackened with spores. These dwarfed spikes are called "basal spikes". 'Lateral' or 'terminal' spikes occur further up the vine. An entire hop crop could be devastated in only a few days.

Ornamentals
A new and particularly aggressive form of impatiens downy mildew has recently emerged as a major threat to the cultivation of ornamental impatiens in the United States, where they are one of the most popular ornamental plants.

Soybeans
Peronospora manshurica infects soybeans, reducing photosynthetic activity, yield, and quality. The fungus spreads by oospores on diseased leaves and/or on infected seed. The disease spreads in environments with high humidity and favors temperatures between 20-22 °C. Tufts of grayish to pale-colored sporangiophores on the underside of leaves easily distinguish the infection from other foliar diseases. The disease is often controlled using the fungicides mancozeb, maneb, or zineb.

Spinach
Downy mildew on spinach is caused by Peronospora effusa, an oomycete pathogen that poses a challenge to spinach production worldwide, especially in organic production.

Sunflowers
Plasmopara halstedii infects sunflowers, producing oospores which can remain dormant in the soil for many years.

See also 
 Blue mold (of tobacco plants)
 Peronosporaceae (with a list of the downy mildew genera)

References 

Water mould plant pathogens and diseases
Fungus common names